Nandihalli is a village in Belgaum of Karnataka, India.

References

Villages in Belagavi district